Helicopter Maritime Strike Squadron Seven Seven (HSM-77) "Saberhawks" is a United States Navy helicopter squadron based at Naval Air Facility, Atsugi, Japan. HSM-77 is attached to Carrier Air Wing Five and deploys aboard  and air capable ships attached to Carrier Strike Group Five (CSG-5). The squadron was established as Helicopter Antisubmarine Squadron (Light) Forty Seven (HSL-47) on 25 September 1987 and was redesignated HSM-77 on 2 Apr 2009.

Mission
The squadron's primary mission is to employ the versatility of the MH-60R helicopter to support the battle group commander's objectives, with emphasis on Surface Warfare (SUW) and Anti-Submarine Warfare (ASW). Secondary missions include Search and Rescue (SAR), Vertical Replenishment (VERTREP), Medical Evacuation (MEDEVAC), Naval Surface Fire Support (NSFS), and Communications Relay (COMREL). The Saberhawks of HSM-77 fly the newest aircraft in the U.S. Navy fleet, the MH-60R Seahawk helicopter, which elevates tactical maritime mission capability to a new level, far surpassing previous fleet capability. With its state-of-the-art avionics, mission systems, and cockpit, the MH-60R is the world's most capable Naval helicopter. The aircraft features a glass cockpit and significant mission system improvements over the SH-60B, which give the MH-60R unmatched capability as an airborne multi-mission Naval platform. The MH-60R is tasked with performing Anti-Submarine Warfare, Surface Warfare, Over-the-Horizon Targeting (OTH-T) on board aircraft carriers and Navy surface combatant ships.

History
Helicopter Maritime Strike Squadron SEVEN SEVEN "Saberhawks" began its illustrious history as Helicopter Anti-Submarine Squadron Light FOUR SEVEN (HSL-47). Established on 25 September 1987 at NAS North Island, the Saberhawks of HSL-47 employed the SH-60B helicopter. Since its inception, the Saberhawks have been at the forefront of helicopter operations in the Pacific Fleet. In 1991, HSL-47 deployed five detachments in support of Operations Desert Shield and Desert Storm, and flew over 2,000 combat, combat support and contingency hours. The Saberhawks also played an integral role in Operation Southern Watch, providing seventeen detachments from 1992–2005. In 1992, Detachment TWO rendered the first assistance to Somali citizens during Operation Restore Hope. HSL-47 deployed the first SH-60B (Armed Helo) detachment (Detachment 4) on an aircraft carrier, in 2001 and 2002-2003 (Operation Iraqi Freedom). Detachment 4 paved the way for HSL-47 to become the first HSL Squadron to become an integrated part of the Carrier Air Wing. The Squadron joined the Broadswords of Carrier Air Wing TWO (CVW-2) on 1 April 2004, bringing eight SH-60B helicopters for their first deployment. Under the Navy's Helo CONOPS "Bravo to Sea (B2C)" initiative, HSL-47 led the LAMPS Community's transition from traditional SH-60B expeditionary operations, to carrier based MH-60R operations.

During its 2004–2005 deployment, HSL-47 became the first LAMPS helicopter squadron deployed in its entirety on board an aircraft carrier, with the squadron providing LAMPS detachments to the other ships within Carrier Strike Group Nine. HSL-47 detachments operated two helicopters from the guided-missile cruiser  as well as two from the guided-missile destroyer .

Following the devastating tsunami in the Indian Ocean on 26 December 2004, HSL-47 and the Abraham Lincoln Carrier Strike Group sped to assist the Indonesian island of Sumatra. Arriving on December 31, the Saberhawks flew a total of 1,223 hours, distributing 404,647 lbs of food, 190,246 lbs of water and supplies, and conducting seventy medical evacuations. Prior to their 2006 deployment, HSL-47 took part in their first Air Wing Fallon in 2005, and also flew mission in response to Hurricane Katrina. In support of Hurricane Katrina relief efforts, HSL-47, conducted 173 rescues and delivered 76,000 pounds of food, water, and medical supplies over nineteen days.

For its 2006 Deployment, two SH-60B Seahawk aviation repairable pack-up kits, including four aviation consumable Vidmar cabinets, were transferred from Naval Air Station North Island, California, to the carrier Abraham Lincoln. This equipment was required to support the second deployment on board Abraham Lincoln of the SH-60B-To-Carrier Pilot program that assigned the carrier to direct support of squadron HSL-47, a full squadron of SH-60B Seahawk helicopters that would be dispersed throughout the carrier strike group. On 15 April 2006, HSL-47 helicopters and the guided-missile destroyer  provided aid to a fishing vessel in distress while operating in the South China Sea. Following the completion of its 2006 deployment, the two SH-60B Seahawk aviation repairable pack-up kits, including four aviation consumable Vidmar cabinets, were returned to Naval Air Station North Island.

On April 2, 2009, HSL-47 transitioned to Helicopter Maritime Strike Squadron SEVEN SEVEN. The Saberhawks were attached to CVW-2 and the Abraham Lincoln Strike Group and deployed for the first time with the MH-60R.

On 14 May 2012, during its 2012 deployment, HSM-77 Detachment Five completed its temporary operational rotation on board the British replenishment oiler  which was serving as the flagship for Combined Task Force 151. This was the first time that a MH-60R helicopter had ever operated from a Royal Navy ship. The detachment's helicopters primarily concentrated on anti-piracy surveillance missions during this two-week period.

In early 2013, the squadron executed a homeport change from NAS North Island, California to NAF Atsugi, Japan, to join the  Carrier Strike Group and Carrier Air Wing 5 (CVW-5). The patrols allowed the Saberhawks to prove their capabilities during numerous multinational training exercises including Talisman Saber 2013, Maritime Counter Special Operations Forces exercises, and Annualex. Additionally, the Saberhawks participated in Operation Damayan, providing Humanitarian Assistance/Disaster Relief in response to Super Typhoon Haiyan. During the eight-day operation, the Saberhawks safely flew six aircraft from sunrise to sunset for a total of 75 sorties and 392 mishap-free flight hours. The squadron delivered 183,920 pounds of food, 6,417 gallons of water, 2,000 pounds of medical supplies, and safely transported 59 refugees and six medevacs. As of August 2015, the squadron operates aboard  Carrier Strike Group as a member of Carrier Air Wing 5 (CVW-5) in support of Forward Deployed Naval Forces Japan.

Command history

Squadron aircraft
SH-60 Seahawk
SH-60B, 1987–2009
MH-60R, 2009–Present (redesignated HSM-77 on 2 April 2009)

Squadron awards
2001 – Battle "E"
2005 – Humanitarian Service Medal
2007 – Battle "E"
2008 – Battle "E"
2010 – Battle "E"
2011 – Battle "E"
2011 – COMPACFLT Retention Excellence Award
2011 – Blue "H" Award
2011 – Blue "M" Award
2011 – CNO Aviation Safety Award
2011 – COMHSMWINGPAC/Sikorsky "Golden Wrench" Maintenance Excellence Award
2011 – Captain Arnold Jay Isbell Trophy
2012 – Secretary of the Navy Safety Excellence Award
2012 – COMHSMWINGPAC/Sikorsky "Golden "Wrench" Maintenance Excellence Award
2012 – Secretary of Defense Phoenix Trophy
2012 – Battle "E"
2012 – COMNAVAIRFOR Admiral J.S. "Jimmy" Thach Award
2014 – COMPACFLT Retention Excellence Award
2014 – Battle "E"
2015 – COMPACFLT Retention Excellence Award
2015 – Meritorious Unit Commendation
2015 – Humanitarian Service Medal
2018 – Secretary of the Navy Safety Excellence Award
2021 - Secretary of Defense Phoenix Trophy

Ships deployed aboard
 
 
 
USS USS Constellation (CV-64)
 RFA Fort Victoria (A387)

Gallery

See also
 History of the United States Navy
 List of United States Navy aircraft squadrons
 Carrier Air Wing Five
 Sikorsky SH-60 Seahawk

References

External links

 Official HSM-77 website
 Official HSM-77 webpage
 Official US Navy webpage

Military units and formations in California
Helicopter maritime strike squadrons of the United States Navy